Midland School District  is a public school district based in Independence County, Arkansas.

The district and schools' mascot and athletic emblem is the Mustang horse. The Midland Mustangs junior varsity and varsity teams compete in the 2A Classification, the state's second smallest classification, as administered by the Arkansas Activities Association.

The school district encompasses  of land in Independence County, and formed as a result of consolidation of the former Pleasant Plains and Floral school districts located in these two rural communities. The consolidation of the Pleasant Plains School District and the Floral School District was effective on July 1, 1985.

Schools 
The Midland School District and both schools are accredited by the Arkansas Department of Education and AdvancED.

 Midland Elementary School, located in Floral and serving prekindergarten through grade 6.
 Midland High School, located in Pleasant Plains and serving grades 7 through 12

References

Further reading
Maps indicating predecessor school districts:
 (Download)

External links
 

Education in Independence County, Arkansas
School districts in Arkansas
1985 establishments in Arkansas
School districts established in 1985